Luca Mattei (born 10 November 1964) is a retired Italian football midfielder.

References

1964 births
Living people
Italian footballers
S.S.D. Varese Calcio players
Como 1907 players
ACF Fiorentina players
Udinese Calcio players
Pisa S.C. players
S.S. Juve Stabia players
Association football midfielders
Serie A players